The 2021 Extreme E Championship was the inaugural season of the Extreme E electric off-road racing series. It started on 3 April with the Desert X-Prix in Saudi Arabia.

Calendar
A provisional race schedule was announced on 17 December 2019, which would have seen a season start in January 2021 with an event in Senegal. But because of delays due to the COVID-19 pandemic the start of the season was pushed back to spring 2021, and a race in Patagonia was presented to replace a Nepal-based event. On 11 June 2021, both South American events –planned to be held in Ushuaia, Argentina and Santarém, Brazil– were cancelled, with championship CEO Alejandro Agag stating they are "seeking alternate destinations". In late July, the Island X-Prix on Sardinia was announced as the first replacement race. A Jurassic X-Prix, due to take place in Dorset, was revealed in October as the new season finale.

The following events were cancelled due to the COVID-19 pandemic:

Race format
A race weekend consists of two rounds of qualifying time trials on Saturday, followed by multi-car races on Sunday. At the Desert X-Prix all races were intended for three cars: a semi-final from which two teams advanced to the final, a "crazy race" from which only one team advanced and a shoot-out for the bottom three places, culminating in a three-car final. The format was tweaked for round two in Senegal, where two teams each from two semi-finals advance to the final which is competed by four teams. Additionally, a "super sector" is introduced, where five extra points are awarded to the fastest team through that sector over the whole weekend. Further alterations were introduced for round three in Greenland, most notably a five-car final with one team progressing from the erstwhile shoot-out, now called "crazy race". An intermediate classification points system was also implemented, with teams receiving points from 9 down to 1 according to their place in each qualifying session; the sum of these, rather than aggregate times, determining their overall qualifying position. These classification points would not contribute to overall championship points. Another rule adjustment was introduced at the season finale in Dorset to accommodate the short nature of the circuit, each session now consisting of three laps, with the starting driver, who in the final would be the female driver, taking the first two.

Teams and drivers

The following teams and drivers are competing in the 2021 Championship. All teams use one of the identical Odyssey 21 electric SUVs manufactured by Spark Racing Technology, with Chip Ganassi Racing running a modified bodywork. Each team consists of a male and a female driver, who share a car and have equal driving duties.

Mid-season changes
 JBXE team owner Jenson Button only drove the first round and then replaced himself with Kevin Hansen.
 Claudia Hürtgen fell ill after the Ocean X-Prix shakedown and had to be replaced by championship reserve driver Jutta Kleinschmidt. Later it was announced that Kleinschmidt would take over the Abt Cupra seat for the remainder of the season.
 Jamie Chadwick missed rounds 3 and 4 because of W Series commitments and was replaced by Veloce reserve driver Emma Gilmour.
 Stéphane Sarrazin parted ways with Veloce prior to the final round of the season. He was replaced by the team's male reserve driver, Lance Woolridge.

Results and standings

X-Prix

Scoring system
Points are awarded to the top nine drivers based on aggregate qualifying standings, as well as the top nine finishers. From the second round on, an additional 5 points are given to the fastest team in the Super Sector over the whole weekend.

Only the best four X-Prix results count towards the drivers' championship.

Drivers' Championship standings

Teams' Championship standings

Notes

References

External links
 

 
Extreme E seasons
Extreme
Extreme E, 2021